Diethanolamine, often abbreviated as DEA or DEOA, is an organic compound with the formula HN(CH2CH2OH)2. Pure diethanolamine is a white solid at room temperature, but its tendencies to absorb water and to supercool meaning that it is often encountered as a colorless, viscous liquid. Diethanolamine is polyfunctional, being a secondary amine and a diol. Like other organic amines, diethanolamine acts as a weak base. Reflecting the hydrophilic character of the secondary amine and hydroxyl groups, DEA is soluble in water. Amides prepared from DEA are often also hydrophilic. In 2013, the chemical was classified by the International Agency for Research on Cancer as "possibly carcinogenic to humans" (Group 2B).

Production
The reaction of ethylene oxide with aqueous ammonia first produces ethanolamine:
C2H4O  +  NH3  →  H2NCH2CH2OH
which reacts with a second and third equivalent of ethylene oxide to give DEA and triethanolamine:
C2H4O  +  H2NCH2CH2OH  →  HN(CH2CH2OH)2
C2H4O  +  HN(CH2CH2OH)2  →  N(CH2CH2OH)3

About 300M kg are produced annually in this way. The ratio of the products can be controlled by changing the stoichiometry of the reactants.

Uses
DEA is used as a surfactant and a corrosion inhibitor. It is used to remove hydrogen sulfide and carbon dioxide from natural gas.

Diethanolamine is widely used in the preparation of diethanolamides and diethanolamine salts of long-chain fatty acids that are formulated into soaps and surfactants used in liquid laundry and dishwashing detergents, cosmetics, shampoos and hair conditioners. In oil refineries, a DEA in water solution is commonly used to remove hydrogen sulfide from sour gas. It has an advantage over a similar amine, ethanolamine, in that a higher concentration may be used for the same corrosion potential. This allows refiners to scrub hydrogen sulfide at a lower circulating amine rate with less overall energy usage.

DEA is a chemical feedstock used in the production of morpholine.

Amides derived from DEA and fatty acids, known as diethanolamides, are amphiphilic.

The reaction of 2-chloro-4,5-diphenyloxazole with DEA gave rise to Ditazole. The reaction of DEA and Isobutyraldehyde with water removed produces an Oxazolidine.

Commonly used ingredients that may contain DEA
DEA is used in the production of diethanolamides, which are common ingredients in cosmetics and shampoos added to confer a creamy texture and foaming action. Consequently, some cosmetics that include diethanolamides as ingredients contain DEA. Some of the most commonly used diethanolamides include:
 Cocamide DEA
 DEA-Cetyl Phosphate
 DEA Oleth-3 Phosphate
 Lauramide DEA
 Myristamide DEA
 Oleamide DEA

Safety
DEA is a potential skin irritant in workers sensitized by exposure to water-based metalworking fluids.  One study showed that DEA inhibits in baby mice the absorption of choline, which is necessary for brain development and maintenance; however, a study in humans determined that dermal treatment for 1 month with a commercially available skin lotion containing DEA resulted in DEA levels that were "far below those concentrations associated with perturbed brain development in the mouse".  In a mouse study of chronic exposure to inhaled DEA at high concentrations (above 150 mg/m3), DEA was found to induce body and organ weight changes, clinical and histopathological changes, indicative of mild blood, liver, kidney and testicular systemic toxicity. A 2009 study found that DEA has potential acute, chronic and subchronic toxicity properties for aquatic species.

References

External links
 Chemical safety card for DEA
 CDC - NIOSH Pocket Guide to Chemical Hazards
 Toxicology and Carcinogenesis Studies
 Products containing diethanolamine, from U.S. Department of Health & Human Services
 Brief technical specification of diethanolamine
 Brief technical specification of diethanolamine pure

Diols
Endocrine disruptors
IARC Group 2B carcinogens
Secondary amines
Ethanolamines